Trolleybuses served the London Passenger Transport Area from 1931 until 1962. For much of its existence, the London system was the largest in the world. It peaked at 68 routes, with a maximum fleet of 1,811 trolleybuses.

History

London's first 60 trolleybuses were introduced by London United Tramways (LUT), operating from Fulwell bus garage in South-West London.

In 1933, LUT was absorbed into the London Passenger Transport Board (LPTB) along with other tram operators, the largest being London County Council (LCC). The LPTB decided to replace all trams with trolleybuses. This started in October 1935, with two more former LUT routes, and continued in stages until June 1940, when World War II caused the suspension of the programme. By then, nearly all the trams North of the River Thames had been replaced, however there were still some 1,100 trams servicing South London. In 1946, a change in policy meant that all remaining tramlines would be replaced by diesel buses. As trolleybuses were bigger than diesel buses (70 seats compared to 56), this meant that more diesel buses were required. It was hoped, however, that this would result in fewer uncollected fares on the smaller vehicles.

In 1948, a new batch of 77 trolleybuses replaced the Diddlers, and those which had been destroyed by enemy action. A further 50 new trolleybuses were delivered in 1952 to replace the oldest vehicles, which were then 16 years old.

In 1954, it was announced that all trolleybuses were to be replaced by diesel buses, with the exception of the post-war vehicles, which would be retained until about 1970 and run over the original LUT routes. Conversion began in 1959, using AEC Regent III RT buses for the first three stages, and new AEC Routemasters for the remainder.

A consortium of Spanish operators bought the post-war vehicles, some of which were converted to motor buses.. The former LUT routes were the last to be converted to diesel buses, on 8 May 1962.

Fleet
The trolleybuses were designed and built specifically to be worthy tram replacements. Like the trams, they were large high-capacity double deckers, with rapid acceleration. All but one had three axles (necessary as they were 30 feet long), and were much quieter in operation than contemporary trams or diesel buses. Trolleybuses were built on AEC, Leyland and British United Traction chassis.

Apart from the Diddlers and a few experimental vehicles, most London trolleybuses were near-identical.  In 1941 and 1943 London Transport acquired 43 trolleybuses that had been ordered for South Africa but could not be shipped there because of the war. These vehicles were allocated to Ilford depot. They formed three different classes and needed special dispensation because they were eight feet wide, six inches more than the then law allowed.

Some later pre-war vehicles made use of modern monocoque construction techniques to produce chassisless bodies, where the mechanical and electrical parts, including the traction motors, are affixed to the bodywork and not to a separate chassis.

One experimental vehicle was proposed to be the forerunner of a small fleet that would use the Kingsway Tramway Subway, but proved in tests, to be impractical. They were all six-wheel vehicles, of which one differed only in having 4-wheel steering and one ex-LUT 4-wheeler.

A handful of vehicles were destroyed during World War II, whilst a couple of dozen others were rebuilt after suffering damage from enemy action—at least one trolleybus was damaged and rebuilt twice.

The Q1 class were the only trolleybuses built for London after the War. A handful of pre-war vehicles were sold for further use in Penang (Malaysia), while most of the post-war ones were exported to Spain where they worked for various operators—some into the 1970s. A few were converted into motor buses.

Some London trolleybuses are now preserved in the United Kingdom by the East Anglia Transport Museum, the London Transport Museum, and The Trolleybus Museum at Sandtoft. One of the 1948 vehicles has also been repatriated from Spain.

List of routes
At its peak, the network was the largest in the world, running 68 routes. The following is a list of the routes that were withdrawn in the replacement programme which ran from 1959 to 1962.

In July 1990, London Regional Transport introduced an express version of bus route 207 as route 607 between Uxbridge and Shepherd's Bush, mirroring the former trolleybus that carried the same number.

Proposed revival
In 2012, it was proposed that a trolleybus based on the New Routemaster be introduced to address pollution concerns along Oxford Street.

See also

 Buses in London
 Transport in London
 List of trolleybus systems in the United Kingdom

References

Notes

Bibliography

External links

Bus transport in London
London
History of transport in London
London
London
1931 establishments in England
1962 disestablishments in England